VMPC can stand for:

 Ventromedial prefrontal cortex
 Variably Modified Permutation Composition